Biplu Ahmed, also spelled as Biplo Ahmed, is a Bangladeshi footballer who plays as a  midfielder. He currently plays for Bashundhara Kings in Bangladesh Premier League and Bangladesh national football team.

International career
On 27 March 2018, Biplu made his senior career debut against Laos during an international friendly.

On 14 November 2019, Biplu scores a goal against Asian giant Oman in 2022 FIFA World Cup qualification – AFC Second Round match.

Career statistics

Club

International goals

U23
Scores and results list Bangladesh's goal tally first.

Senior
Scores and results list Bangladesh's goal tally first.

References 

Sheikh Russel KC players
Bangladeshi footballers
Bangladesh youth international footballers
Living people
1999 births
People from Sylhet
Association football wingers
South Asian Games bronze medalists for Bangladesh
South Asian Games medalists in football
Bangladesh international footballers